Akseli Ensio "Axu" Kokkonen (born 27 February 1984) is a Norwegian former ski jumper who competed from 2001 to 2010. He originally had Finnish nationality, but from the 2009/10 World Cup season onwards he represented Norway.

External links

1984 births
Living people
Skiers from Oslo
Finnish male ski jumpers
Norwegian male ski jumpers
Norwegian people of Finnish descent